The Maida–Windygates Border Crossing connects the cities of Langdon, North Dakota and Morden, Manitoba on the Canada–United States border. North Dakota Highway 1 on the American side joins Manitoba Highway 31 on the Canadian side.

Canadian side
In terms of the region, the earliest customs service began at Snowflake in the 1880s, where the North-West Mounted Police (NWMP) collected duties, issued permits, and patrolled the border. A customs office existed at Mowbray 1899–1908 under the administrative oversight of the Port of Winnipeg, at which time the Snowflake office opened. Mowbray reopened, operating 1926–1930, at which time the Windygates office opened about  eastward along the border.

In 1959, a driver and passenger died when their car crashed into the customs building. The present border station was built in 1963.

In 2020, the former border hours of 9am–10pm reduced, becoming 9am–5pm.

US side
The early border station history at Maida is unclear, but an office was known to exist by the late 1930s. The station built in 1961 was replaced in 2012. The construction required a local bar named Jacks Bar to be torn down. The once booming Maida has become a ghost town.

See also
 List of Canada–United States border crossings

Footnotes

References

Canada–United States border crossings
1930 establishments in Manitoba
1929 establishments in North Dakota
Buildings and structures in Cavalier County, North Dakota